The Precipice Game is a 2016 Chinese action thriller film directed by Wang Zao and starring Ruby Lin, Peter Ho, Jin Shijia, Gai Yuexi, and Wang Ji.

Plot
Liu Chenchen, a free-spirited young woman, rebels against her wealthy family and elopes with her boyfriend to join a cruise-bond treasure hunt. But what began as an innocent game with promises of great reward soon turns into a battle for survival when the contestants are thrown into a mysterious world of intrigue and chaos in the middle of the sea. Liu relies only on her wits and her new friends to survive, all the while unmasking foes and learning that nothing is what it seems. But as her companions are attacked one by one, Liu must do everything she can to escape.

Casts
 Ruby Lin as Liu Chenchen		
 Peter Ho as Ye Qing
 Jin Shijia as Yu Bingchuan		
 Gai Yuexi as Sun Meng
 Wang Ji as Mother
 Li Lin as Chen Hongfan
 Li Shangyi as Liu Dapeng
 Yes as Chi Bang
 Shi Zhi as Chi Bang

Production
The Precipice Game was filmed in Qingdao, China. Shooting of the film wrapped up on November, 2015.

References

External links
 
  The Precipice Game Official Weibo

2016 films
Chinese action thriller films
2016 action thriller films
Films shot in Shandong
Fundamental Films films
Films about death games
2010s Mandarin-language films